The Nova Phorus is an Austrian single-place paraglider that was designed by Hannes Papesch and produced by Nova Performance Paragliders of Innsbruck. It is now out of production.

Design and development
The aircraft was designed as a beginner glider. The models are each named for their relative size.

Variants
Phorus S
Small-sized model for light pilots. The glider model is DHV 1 and AFNOR Standard certified.
Phorus M
Mid-sized model for medium-weight pilots. The glider model is DHV 1 and AFNOR Standard certified.
Phorus L
Large-sized model for heavier pilots. The glider model is DHV 1 and AFNOR Standard certified.

Specifications (Phorus M)

References

Phorus
Paragliders